Sinaloa de Leyva is a town in the Mexican state of Sinaloa. 
The honorific "de Leyva" commemorates , an early supporter of Francisco I. Madero in the Mexican Revolution who was born there.

The town was founded on 30 April 1583 as Villa de San Felipe y Santiago de Sinaloa by Don Pedro de Montoya. In 1585 the second foundation of the town was carried out by Antonio Ruiz, Bartolomé de Mondragón, Tomás de Soberanes, Juan Martínez del Castillo y Juan Caballero.  By 1590, Ruiz was its mayor, and the town was home to nine people who eked out a living, but the situation improved through their discovery of the mines of Chínipas, and the arrival of the Jesuits in 1591.  At the end of the sixteenth century, Ruiz wrote an autobiography where he detailed the early history of San Felipe y Santiago, and Sinaloa.

This was the base for Diego de Hurdaide's subjugation of the Sinaloas, Tehuecos, Ahomes and Zuaques and the extension of Spanish control over the Fuerte River valley, and thus to the northern edge of modern Sinaloa.

Sinaloa serves as the municipal seat for the surrounding municipality (municipio) of Sinaloa, Sinaloa. The municipality reported 88,282 inhabitants in the 2010 census. It is a former capital of the state of Sinaloa.

References

External links
 http://www.sinaloa.gob.mx/conociendo/municipios/sinaloa.htm

Populated places established in 1583
Populated places in Sinaloa
1583 establishments in the Spanish Empire